Dissimulation could refer to:

 Dissimulation (Hope for the Dying album), a 2011 album by Hope for the Dying
 Dissimulation (KSI album), a 2020 album by KSI
 Dissimulate (album), a 2002 death metal album by The Berzerker
 Dissembling or lying
 Preference falsification

See also
Dissimilation, in linguistics